November 1 - Eastern Orthodox liturgical calendar - November 3

All fixed commemorations below celebrated on November 15 by Orthodox Churches on the Old Calendar.

For November 2nd, Orthodox Churches on the Old Calendar commemorate the Saints listed on October 20.

Saints
 The Holy Senators of Sebasteia, martyrs of senatorial rank, martyred under Licinius, by fire (c. 315)
 Martyrs Eudoxios, Agapios, and eight others with them, soldiers from Sebasteia, martyred under Licinius (c. 315)  (see also: November 3)
 Women-Martyrs Kyriaki (Cyriaca), Domnina and Domna, by the sword.
 Martyrs Acindynus, Pegasius, Aphthonius, Elpidephorus, Anempodistus, and those with them, of Persia (341)
 Holy 7,000 Martyrs who suffered in Persia, (along with Sts Acindynus, Pegasias, Aphthonius, Elpidephorus, and Anempodistus), during the reign of King Sapor II (310-381)
 St. Marcian of Cyrrhus, monk in Syria, confessor (c. 388)
 Saint Anthony the Confessor, Archbishop of Thessalonica (844)

Pre-Schism Western saints
 Saint Justus of Trieste, sentenced to death by drowning (293)
 Martyrs Publius, Victor, Hermes and Papias, in North Africa.
 Saint Victorinus of Pettau, Bishop of Pettau in Styria in Austria and the earliest exegete in the West (304)
 Saint Erc of Slane, Bishop of Slane, Ireland (512)  (see also: October 31)
 Saint Ambrose, abbot of the monastery of St. Moritz in Agaunum in Switzerland (532 or 582).
 Saint George of Vienne, Bishop of Vienne in Gaul (c. 699)
 Saints Baya (Bava) and Maura, Anchoresses in Scotland; St Bava guided St Maura and the latter became abbess of a convent (c. 10th century)
 Saint Amicus, born near Camerino in Italy, he became a priest, then a hermit and finally a monk at St Peter's in Fonte Avellana (c. 1045)

Post-Schism Orthodox saints
 Blessed Cyprian of Storozhev, former outlaw (Olonets) (16th century)
 Archimandrite Gabriel (Urgebadze), Confessor and Fool-for-Christ (1995)  ( New style date for old calendar feast see: October 20 )

New martyrs and confessors
 New Hieromartyrs Bishop Victorinus (1918)
 New Hieromartyr Basil Luzgin, Priest, of Glazomicha (1918)
 New Hieromartyrs Ananias Aristov of Perm, and Constantine Organov, Priests (1918)

Other commemorations
 Icon of God of Shuya-Smolensk (Shuyskaya-Smolenskaya) (1654-1655)

Icon gallery

Notes

References

Sources 
 November 2/15. Orthodox Calendar (PRAVOSLAVIE.RU).
 November 15 / November 2. HOLY TRINITY RUSSIAN ORTHODOX CHURCH (A parish of the Patriarchate of Moscow).
 November 2. OCA - The Lives of the Saints.
 November 2. Latin Saints of the Orthodox Patriarchate of Rome.
 The Roman Martyrology. Transl. by the Archbishop of Baltimore. Last Edition, According to the Copy Printed at Rome in 1914. Revised Edition, with the Imprimatur of His Eminence Cardinal Gibbons. Baltimore: John Murphy Company, 1916. pp. 338–339.
 Rev. Richard Stanton. A Menology of England and Wales, or, Brief Memorials of the Ancient British and English Saints Arranged According to the Calendar, Together with the Martyrs of the 16th and 17th Centuries. London: Burns & Oates, 1892. p. 521-522.
Greek Sources
 Great Synaxaristes:  2 ΝΟΕΜΒΡΙΟΥ. ΜΕΓΑΣ ΣΥΝΑΞΑΡΙΣΤΗΣ.
  Συναξαριστής. 2 Νοεμβρίου. ECCLESIA.GR. (H ΕΚΚΛΗΣΙΑ ΤΗΣ ΕΛΛΑΔΟΣ). 
Russian Sources
  15 ноября (2 ноября). Православная Энциклопедия под редакцией Патриарха Московского и всея Руси Кирилла (электронная версия). (Orthodox Encyclopedia - Pravenc.ru).
  2 ноября (ст.ст.) 15 ноября 2013 (нов. ст.). Русская Православная Церковь Отдел внешних церковных связей. (DECR).

November in the Eastern Orthodox calendar